365 Days: This Day is a 2022 erotic thriller film directed by Barbara Białowąs and Tomasz Mandes. Serving as a sequel to 365 Days, it is based on This Day, the second novel of a trilogy by Blanka Lipińska and stars Anna-Maria Sieklucka, Michele Morrone, Rebecca Casiraghi and Magdalena Lamparska.

The film was released worldwide on Netflix on April 27, 2022, to similar widely negative critical reception as its predecessor. A sequel, The Next 365 Days, was released on August 19, 2022.

Plot
The movie starts with Massimo and Laura getting married. Laura has lost her baby due to the accident that took place in the final scenes of the previous movie. They both are happy until Laura starts feeling bored as she has nothing to do while Massimo is busy with his work. Daily arguments force her mind to get devoted to Nacho, Massimo's gardener. One night at a party in Massimo's house, Laura finds Massimo having sex with his ex-girlfriend Anna. She is heartbroken and she leaves the party, where she encounters Nacho. They both flee to an island. Meanwhile, Massimo is confused about what happened and starts searching for Laura. Laura starts enjoying her life on the island and at the same time she fantasizes about having sex with Nacho.

One day, Nacho tells Laura to meet his father and tells her that his father is the head of the rival mafia gang of Massimo. Laura is shocked and feels betrayed, but still accompanies Nacho to his father's place. Laura is left with a few guards and Nacho goes to meet his father. Massimo is having an argument with Nacho's father and it is revealed that they have Laura with them. Suddenly, Nacho realizes that he left Laura with the wrong guards and Massimo and Nacho rush to save Laura. Meanwhile, Laura is kidnapped by Massimo's estranged and unstable twin brother, Adriano, who she had no prior knowledge of. It's revealed that the night Laura saw Massimo having sex with Anna it was Adriano. Massimo enters the place and tries to save Laura. Massimo and Adriano had always been rivals, and it was all part of Adriano's plan. Laura runs and she is shot by Anna and Adriano, who are in turn shot and killed by Massimo and Nacho. The movie ends with Nacho leaving and Laura lying in the arms of Massimo, her fate uncertain.

Cast
 Anna-Maria Sieklucka as Laura Biel
 Michele Morrone as Don Massimo Torricelli and Adriano Torricelli (Don Massimo's twin brother)
 Rebecca Casiraghi as Sexy girl
 Magdalena Lamparska as Olga
 Otar Saralidze as Domenico
 Simone Susinna as Nacho
 Natasza Urbańska as Anna

Production
Principal photography began in May 2021, in areas around Italy and Poland, with Anna-Maria Sieklucka and Magdalena Lamparska reprising their roles from the first film. Production was originally scheduled to begin in 2020, in Sicily and Poland, but was delayed due to the COVID-19 pandemic. In February 2021, Michele Morrone was also confirmed to be reprising his role.

Soundtrack

Release
365 Days: This Day was released on April 27, 2022, on Netflix, in Poland, the United States, and the United Kingdom.

Reception
 

Jonathan Wilson, of Ready Steady Cut, gave the film a negative review, saying how the film, alongside other erotic films, had "deeply unhealthy depictions of sex and relationships that glamorize and justify various forms of controlling abuse and domination", and there was only 15 minutes of plot in the film, if the sex montages, which comprised 80% of the film, were taken out. Jessica Kiang, of Variety, said the film "is piping hot trash". Kate Erbland, of IndieWire, also gave a negative review, saying "most audiences who tune into 365 Days: This Day are likely not seeking out female empowerment tales or coherent plots, but the disdain with which the film treats both its viewers and its star can't help but grate." Oli Welsh, of Polygon, said "as difficult as it might be to believe, it's even worse than the first movie. But it goes down easier, because much of the first film's ugly side has been smoothed away." Shaun Munro, of Flickering Myth, gave the film a 1 out of 5, saying "this blandly horny sequel tries in vain to distance itself from its predecessor's icky foundations, and while its sub-telenovela plot is outrageous enough to be perversely entertaining, by any standard metric it's truly terrible stuff."

Sequel
Plans for a sequel, titled The Next 365 Days, were delayed due to the COVID-19 pandemic. In May 2021, it was reported that Netflix had started filming The Next 365 Days concurrently with This Day. Morrone, Sieklucka, and Lamparska were all confirmed to return. The film was released on August 19, 2022.

References

External links
 
 

2020s English-language films
2020s erotic drama films
2020s Italian-language films
2020s Polish-language films
2022 films
2022 multilingual films
2022 romantic drama films
Erotic romance films
Film productions suspended due to the COVID-19 pandemic
Films about the Sicilian Mafia
Films based on Polish novels
Films directed by Barbara Białowąs
Films directed by Tomasz Mandes
Films postponed due to the COVID-19 pandemic
Films produced by Tomasz Mandes
Films set in Warsaw
Films shot in Italy
Films shot in Poland
Films with screenplays by Barbara Białowąs
Films with screenplays by Blanka Lipińska
Films with screenplays by Tomasz Klimala
Films with screenplays by Tomasz Mandes
Gangster films
Polish erotic drama films
Polish multilingual films
Polish romantic drama films